The Symphony No. 61 in D major, Hoboken I/61, is a symphony by Joseph Haydn.  The autograph has survived and is dated 1776.

Movements
The symphony is scored for flute, two oboes, two bassoons, two horns, timpani and strings.  There are four movements:
Vivace
Adagio,  in A major
Menuetto & Trio: Allegretto, 
Finale: Prestissimo

The opening movement is colorfully orchestrated.  Particularly notable is the second theme which starts with pulsating oboes and bassoon before the flute enters with a falling motif.  The expositional coda also features a pulsating accompaniment against a chromatic rise in the strings.

Daniel Heartz has noted the "hunt"-like character of the final movement, and Haydn's greater mastery of rondo form compared to earlier symphonies.

References

Symphony 061
1776 compositions
Compositions in D major